Women's Wares is a 1927 silent drama film directed by Arthur Gregor and starring Evelyn Brent.

Cast 
 Evelyn Brent as Dolly Morton
 Bert Lytell as Robert Crane
 Larry Kent as Jimmie Hayes
 Gertrude Short as Maisie Duncan
 Myrtle Stedman as Mrs. James Crane
 Richard Tucker as Frank Stanton
 Cissy Fitzgerald as Mrs. Frank Stanton

References

External links 

1920 films
1920 drama films
American black-and-white films
American silent feature films
Films directed by Arthur Gregor
1927 films
1920s English-language films
Tiffany Pictures films
Silent American drama films
1927 drama films
1920s American films